Charles Douglas Richard Hanbury-Tracy, 4th Baron Sudeley PC FRS (3 July 1840 – 9 December 1922), styled The Honourable Charles Hanbury-Tracy from 1858 to 1877, was a British Liberal politician. He served as Captain of the Honourable Corps of Gentlemen-at-Arms under William Ewart Gladstone in 1886.

Background
Sudeley was a younger son of Thomas Hanbury-Tracy, 2nd Baron Sudeley, and his wife Emma Eliza Alicia Dawkins-Pennant, daughter of George Hay Dawkins-Pennant, of Penrhyn Castle.

Political career
Sudeley entered the House of Commons for Montgomery in 1863, a seat he held until 1877 when he succeeded in the barony on the death of his elder brother. He served under William Ewart Gladstone as a Lord-in-waiting (government whip in the House of Lords) from 1880 to 1885 and as Captain of the Honourable Corps of Gentlemen-at-Arms from February to July 1886. The latter year Sudeley was also sworn of the Privy Council. Apart from his political career he was a Fellow of the Royal Society. He later came into financial difficulties and was declared bankrupt in 1893. This caused the sale of the family seat of Toddington Manor.

Family
Lord Sudeley married the writer Ada Maria Katherine Tollemache, daughter of the Honourable Frederick James Tollemache, in 1868. He died in December 1922, aged 82, and was succeeded in the barony by his eldest son, William.

References

External links

1840 births
1922 deaths
Barons in the Peerage of the United Kingdom
Younger sons of barons
Honourable Corps of Gentlemen at Arms
Fellows of the Royal Society
Members of the Privy Council of the United Kingdom
UK MPs 1859–1865
UK MPs 1865–1868
UK MPs 1868–1874
UK MPs 1874–1880
Sudeley, B4
Liberal Party (UK) MPs for Welsh constituencies
Hanbury-Tracy family